Medvedevo (Maskasola) is an urban locality (an urban-type settlement) and the administrative center of Medvedevsky District of the Mari El Republic, Russia. As of the 2010 Census, its population was 16,841.

Administrative and municipal status
Within the framework of administrative divisions, Medvedevo serves as the administrative center of Medvedevsky District. As an administrative division, the urban-type settlement of Medvedevo is incorporated within Medvedevsky District as Medvedevo Urban-Type Settlement (an administrative division of the district). As a municipal division, Medvedevo Urban-Type Settlement is incorporated within Medvedevsky Municipal District as Medvedevo Urban Settlement.

References

Notes

Sources

Urban-type settlements in the Mari El Republic
